Marya Kasterska (5 February 1894 – 7 December 1969) was a Polish writer, journalist and literary critic who lived in France.

Biography
She was born in Warsaw. She received a doctorate from the University of Paris in 1918. Her articles appeared in various publications, including Les Nouvelles littéraires, La vie catholique, La Revue mondiale, La Quinzaine critique and '. In Paris, she promoted knowledge there of Polish and Romanian culture.

In 1918, she married , a Romanian mathematician, in Paris. The couple hosted a salon in their home in the Latin Quarter of Paris which was attended by various intellectuals including Henry de Montherlant, Mircea Eliade, Paul Montel and Émile Borel.

Awards and honours
In 1961, she was awarded the Prix d'Aumale by the French Academy of Sciences for her work editing the biography for her husband's works. In 1967, she was awarded the Prix Valentine de Wolmar by the Académie française for her published work.

References 

1894 births
1969 deaths
20th-century Polish women writers
Polish women journalists
Polish literary critics
Polish women literary critics
20th-century Polish journalists